Almaraz Nuclear Power Plant is a nuclear power station at Almaraz in Spain and uses the Tagus River, that runs into Portugal, for cooling.

It consists of two PWRs of 1011 and 1006 MWe.

The Arrocampo reservoir as system to refrigerate the Nuclear Plant

The refrigeration of the Almaraz nuclear power plant was the first reason for the construction of the Arrocampo Reservoir in 1976.

The water is taken from the Tagus River and covers a U-shaped circuit of 25 km which allows the cooling of the heat generated by the two nuclear reactors of the plant. 
(See the illustration of the water circulation in Arrocampo)

The walls of thermic separation (pantallas de separación térmica in Spanish) (PST) are 11 km long and 8 m high.

The tops of these walls are used by great cormorants and great egret as standing, resting and sleeping areas.

History

In 1975 Luis E. Echávarri was made project manager of the Plant. In 1985 he became Technical Director of the Spanish Nuclear Safety Council (CSN), and in 1987 he was named Commissioner of the CSN.

The first reactor began operating in 1981 and the second in 1983. It occupies an area of 1683 hectares.

As of 2017 Spain had approved a nuclear waste warehouse at Almaraz without carrying out any consultations or impact studies. Portugal has taken the matter to the EU, protests planned on January 12 at Spanish consulates were organised by Movimiento Ibérico Antinuclear, which coincided with a meeting between Portuguese and Spanish delegates in Madrid, which ended in deadlock and Portugal to complain to the EU that Spain ignored the potential cross-border impact with no studies being carried out, which is against European Union rules.

Spanish secretary of State for the EU Jorge Toledo Albiñana has said work will start regardless of Portugals complaints, and uranium bars that will remain radioactive for the next 300 years will be stored on site.

In May 2017 the Portuguese Parliament approved the Ecologist Party "The Greens" motion to request the closure of Spain's Almaraz nuclear plant during the next Iberian summit. Stating that after 2020 the plant should be shut down and the Greens asked the government to take a “resolute position,” for the facility, located only 100 kilometres form the Portuguese border. Environmentalists have warned that the plan to build a nuclear waste warehouse site next to the power plant almost certainly indicates that Spain plans to extend the life of the Almaraz power plant beyond the year 2020.

Safety record

On the 28 January 2016, the Spanish Nuclear Safety Council inspectors found serious failings in the water pump engines at the plant, which have potential operational issues of the cooling system and could pose a serious risk to local people and the environment in Spain and in neighboring Portugal. Greenpeace has labelled the plant as an ‘extreme case’ in its study on the application of minimum safety standards introduced in Europe after the Fukushima accident.

On the 21 September 2016, defective parts were used on unit 1's second and third steam generators and on unit 2's third steam generator, as well as the rim of the reactor lid in unit 2. It had already been reported that the water pump engines had been stopped twice, the plant's cooling system was reported as not 100% reliable.

On the 10 April 2017, the Spanish Nuclear Safety Council issued a statement stating there was an unscheduled stoppage of the main number two pump at 9:57am Spanish time (8:57am Lisbon time).

See also

Nuclear power in Spain

References

External links
 Nuclear Power Plants - Spain at the Nuclear Tourist website.

Nuclear power stations in Spain
Nuclear power stations using pressurized water reactors
Energy in Extremadura